Bunny slippers are a type of slipper in the shape of a cartoon rabbit. Advertisements date back as far as 1920.

References

Footwear
Rabbits and hares in popular culture